U.S. Route 136 (US 136) runs east–west across central Illinois for . US 136 enters the state from Iowa across the Keokuk–Hamilton Bridge over the Mississippi River between Keokuk, Iowa, and Hamilton, Illinois, and exits into Indiana east of Danville. The largest population centers along the route are Macomb, Rantoul, and Danville.

For nearly its entire route, US 136 is two-lane and rural, with the exception of portions in and around major towns and cities and its overlap with the Chicago–Kansas City Expressway. Despite the highway's rural routing, it has junctions into four Interstates: Interstate 155 (I-155), I-55, I-74, and I-57. Additionally, US 136 contains what is perhaps one of the longest straight stretches of a U.S. Highway east of the Mississippi River, running nearly  without any deviations from north of Easton to just west of Rantoul.

Route description

Hamilton to Havana

From the Keokuk–Hamilton Bridge, US 136 exits Keokuk and enters Hamilton. US 136 then runs concurrently with Illinois Route 96 (IL 96) in Hamilton. It then bends slightly northwestward east of Elvaston as it is near Carthage. In Carthage, US 136 then runs concurrently with IL 94 until it reaches a diamond interchange east of the city. At that point, IL 94 leaves US 136 while it joins with IL 110 (CKC)/IL 336. US 136 then leaves the concurrency southwest of Tennessee. North of the McDonough County Courthouse in downtown Macomb, US 67 joins in from the north. US 67 then branches south from US 136 east of Macomb. It then turns southward as it intersects IL 41. Then, it turns southeast north of Adair and then south and then east at Table Grove. At Duncan Mills, US 136 then runs concurrently with US 24 and IL 100. US 24 then leaves as the other two routes bending eastward. IL 100 soon leaves US 136. Just west of the Scott W. Lucas Bridge, IL 78 and IL 97 join with US 136. After the crossing, IL 78 turns southward, leaving the concurrency.

Havana to Indiana state line
US 136 then turns northward and then eastward from IL 97. It then meets IL 29 from the south where it travels concurrently until it leaves northward near San Jose. Further east, US 136 reaches four diamond interchanges with I-155, I-55, US 51, and I-74 respectively. Furthermore, it also intersects US 150, IL 54, and IL 47. West of Rantoul, US 136 meets I-57 at a parclo interchange. In downtown Rantoul, it intersects US 45. At Armstrong, it turns south and then back east which overlaps IL 49. In the middle of Henning and Alvin, US 136 turns south which overlaps IL 1. The concurrency runs from the junction of US 136/IL 1/IL 119 to the junction of US 136/US 150/IL 1 in Danville. At that point, US 136 turns eastward all the way to Indiana.

History
Initially, before the formation of US 136, parts of IL 9, IL 31, IL 43, IL 24, IL 1, and IL 10 followed what is now part of US 136. The rest of it wasn't built yet. Over time, new roads were being built. By 1929, IL 98, IL 122, and IL 119 were established. In 1935, IL 31 was superseded by US 24 while IL 43 was superseded by parts of IL 122 and IL 120. In 1939, a part of Illinois Route 10 (IL 10) moved its western terminus from Decatur to Keokuk, Iowa. This caused the relocation of IL 98 from Adair–Duncan Mills route to its present-day routing. This also caused IL 9 to relocate northward. Also, IL 119 finished extending to IL 10 east of Havana. Since 1950, most of IL 119, as well as some sections of IL 10, were removed in favor of US 136.

Major intersections

See also

References

External links

Illinois
Transportation in Hancock County, Illinois
Transportation in McDonough County, Illinois
Transportation in Fulton County, Illinois
Transportation in Mason County, Illinois
Transportation in Logan County, Illinois
Transportation in McLean County, Illinois
Transportation in Champaign County, Illinois
Transportation in Vermilion County, Illinois
36-1